Jhonatan Restrepo Valencia (born November 28, 1994) is a Colombian cyclist, who currently rides for UCI Continental team .

Career
Born in Pácora, Caldas, Restrepo was a competitive swimmer during his youth, winning four national titles in Colombia. 

According to Restrepo, he and his manager contacted a number of UCI WorldTeams via Facebook from December 2014 with a view to gaining a professional contract, and after becoming Pan-American Under-23 Champion in 2015, he received an offer from Katusha for a position as a stagiaire that season, subsequently remaining with the team for 2016. He participated in the 2015 Pan American Games and was first in the team pursuit. He was named in the startlist for the 2016 Vuelta a España. In October 2020, he was named in the startlist for the 2020 Giro d'Italia.

Major results

2013
 1st Stage 1 Vuelta de la Juventud de Colombia
 Pan American Track Championships
2nd  Team pursuit
3rd  Individual pursuit
 2nd  Individual pursuit, Bolivarian Games
2014
 Pan American Track Championships
1st  Team pursuit
2nd  Madison (with Jordan Parra)
2015
 1st  Team pursuit, Pan American Games
 Pan American Track Championships
1st  Team pursuit
1st  Individual pursuit
2nd  Madison (with Juan Arango)
 Pan American Under-23 Road Championships
1st  Road race
5th Time trial
 3rd Overall Vuelta de la Juventud de Colombia
1st Points classification
1st Stage 6
2016
  Combativity award Stage 8 Vuelta a España
2017
 2nd Vuelta a Murcia
 4th Cadel Evans Great Ocean Road Race
 10th Overall Tour Down Under
1st  Young rider classification
2018
 4th Gran Piemonte
2019
 1st  Mountains classification Vuelta a Aragón
 5th Overall Circuit de la Sarthe
 7th Overall Tour of Turkey
 8th Overall Vuelta a la Comunidad de Madrid
2020
 Vuelta al Táchira
1st Stages 3 & 5
 6th Overall Tour du Rwanda
1st Stages 3, 5, 6 & 7 (ITT)
2021
 1st  Mountains classification Boucles de la Mayenne
 2nd Trofeo Matteotti
 3rd Veneto Classic
 4th Overall Giro di Sicilia
 5th Overall Tour du Rwanda
1st Stage 7 (ITT)
 7th Giro del Veneto
2022
 1st Stage 3 Tour du Rwanda

Grand Tour general classification results timeline

References

External links

1994 births
Living people
Colombian male cyclists
Pan American Games medalists in cycling
Pan American Games gold medalists for Colombia
Cyclists at the 2015 Pan American Games
Medalists at the 2015 Pan American Games
People from Caldas Department
21st-century Colombian people